Lüder is a municipality in Lower Saxony, Germany.

Luder or Lüder may also refer to:

Peter Luder (1415–1472), professor of Latin at the University of Heidelberg
Martin Luder (Martin Luther) (1483–1546), theologian who started the reformation
Ludwig von Lüder (1795–1862), Bavarian Major general and war minister
Ítalo Argentino Lúder (1916–2008), Argentine politician and president
Owen Luder  (b. 1928), English architect
Ian Luder  (b. 1951), Lord Mayor of London from 2008 to 2009
Simone Niggli-Luder (b. 1978), Swiss orienteering athlete
Leonie Luder (b. 1986), German actress and TV-presenter
Hans Luder, coach of FC Thun 1945-48
Hans Luder, father of the theologian Martin Luther
Lüder (river), a river of Hesse, Germany, tributary of the Fulda